Herbert John Locke (1864–1944) was Mayor of East Fremantle, Western Australia from 1924–1931 and 1934–1944. He married Ann Rachel White in 1893.

A furniture factory, Locke's Ltd. in Ada Street, South Fremantle was founded by Herbert's brother Charles James Locke.

Herbert Locke owned land in White Gum Valley.

A park, Locke Park, on the corner of Moss and Fletcher streets in East Fremantle, is named in his honour.

References 

1944 deaths
Mayors of places in Western Australia
1864 births
Western Australian local councillors
English emigrants to colonial Australia
20th-century Australian politicians